Sanchong is a station of the Zhonghe–Xinlu line on Taipei Metro and the Taoyuan Airport MRT located in Sanchong District, New Taipei, Taiwan. The station opened for service on 5 January 2012. It is a transfer station with the Taoyuan Airport MRT, which opened on 2 March 2017.

Station overview

The Orange Line section is a four-level, underground station has an island platform. It is located beneath Jieyun Rd., Lane 3 and Shuhong East Rd, near the Erchong flood diversion channel. It was scheduled to open in March 2012 along with most of the Xinzhuang Line, but opened for service earlier on 5 January 2012.

Sanchong station is a transfer station with the Taoyuan Airport MRT, which is a four-level, elevated station with an island platform.

Construction
It has three entrances, one accessibility elevator, and three vent shafts. Two of the entrances are located next to a joint development lot. An  plot of land beside the station is being set aside for joint development projects. The entrance features a double arch-shaped glass roof.

Design
The Line 6 station design is based on a theme of "Waterfront Green Land" with walls and floors inlaid with various materials to form patterns (such as rushing water).

Station layout

Exits
Exit 1: No. 36, Jieyun Rd., near Shuhong E. Rd. 
Exit 2: Jieyun Rd. (near Lane 22)
Exit 3: Jieyun Rd. (near Lane 19)

Around the station
Erchong Floodway
Erchong Floodway Park
Jimei Elementary School
Sanchong High School
New Taipei Bridge
Chongxin Bridge
Zhongxing Bridge
New Taipei Metropolitan Park

References

2012 establishments in Taiwan
Zhonghe–Xinlu line stations
Railway stations opened in 2012
Taoyuan Airport MRT stations
Transportation in New Taipei
Buildings and structures in New Taipei